Håvard Østgaard is a Norwegian sport shooter who won the 2017 IPSC Rifle World Shoot in the Standard division. In 2015, he placed 4th at the IPSC European Rifle Championship. Østgaard also has numerous Norwegian and Nordic titles having won the IPSC Nordic Rifle Championship two times (2015 and 2016), the IPSC Norwegian Rifle Championship three times (2014, 2015 and 2016) and the IPSC Norwegian Tournament Championship four times (2012, 2014, 2015 and 2016).

See also 
 Teemu Rintala, Finnish sport shooter
 Sami Hautamäki, Finnish sport shooter
 Josh Froelich, American sport shooter

References 

IPSC shooters
Norwegian male sport shooters
Living people
Year of birth missing (living people)